The Roman Catholic Diocese of Sarh is a diocese in Sarh in the Ecclesiastical province of N'Djamena in Chad.

History
 December 22, 1961: Established as Diocese of Fort-Archambault from the Diocese of Fort-Lamy
 August 22, 1972: Renamed as Diocese of Sarh

Special churches
The cathedral is Cathédrale Notre Dame de l’Immaculée Conception in Sarh.

Bishops

Ordinaries, in reverse chronological order
Bishops of Sarh, below
 Miguel Ángel Sebastián Martínez MCCJ (October 10, 2018 – present)
 Edmond Jitangar (October 11, 1991 – August 20, 2016), appointed Archbishop of N’Djaména 
 Matthias N’Gartéri Mayadi (March 7, 1987 – June 11, 1990), appointed Bishop of Moundou 
 Henri Véniat, S.J. (August 22, 1972 – March 7, 1987); see below

Bishop of Fort-Archambault, below
 Henri Véniat, S.J. (December 22, 1961 – August 22, 1972); see above

Auxiliary bishop
Matthias N’Gartéri Mayadi (1985-1987), appointed Bishop here

See also
Roman Catholicism in Chad

Sources
 GCatholic.org

Sarh
Christian organizations established in 1961
Roman Catholic dioceses and prelatures established in the 20th century
1961 establishments in Chad
Roman Catholic Ecclesiastical Province of N'Djaména